Edward Augustus Dickson (1879–1956) was an American educator. He co-founded the University of California, Los Angeles.

Biography

Early life
Edward Augustus Dickson was born in Sheboygan, Wisconsin, on August 29, 1879. He moved to California in 1885 with his family. He graduated from the University of California, Berkeley in 1901.

Career
He taught in Japan in 1901-1902. Back in California, he worked as a journalist for the Sacramento Record-Union, the San Francisco Chronicle, and the Los Angeles Express. In 1919, he purchased the Los Angeles Express and became its editor.

In 1912, at the age of thirty-three, he was appointed to the Board of Regents of the Los Angeles State Normal School, the precursor to UCLA. On October 25, 1917, he had lunch with Ernest Carroll Moore (1871-1955)  at the Jonathan Club, a private member's club in Los Angeles. Together, they decided to establish the Southern Branch in Westwood, Los Angeles, which eventually became the new campus of UCLA. He served as a Regent for forty-three years, until 1956. He also served as the President of the Board of Regents in 1948.

He served as President of the Western Federal Savings and Loan Association from 1931 to 1956. He also sat on the board of directors of the Central Investment Corporation.

He was a member of the California Republican Party. Moreover, he co-founded the Lincoln–Roosevelt League and served as a delegate to the 1932 Republican National Convention. He also served on the board of directors of the Olympic Games Association for the 1932 Summer Olympics in Los Angeles. Furthermore, he was involved with the Los Angeles Art Association, the Los Angeles County Art Institute and the UCLA Art Council. He was featured in Who's Who in America.

Personal life
He married Wilhelmina de Wolff in 1907.

Death
He died on February 22, 1956, at the age of seventy-six.

Bibliography
The University of California at Los Angeles: Its Origin and Formative Years (1955)

References

1879 births
1956 deaths
People from Sheboygan, Wisconsin
People from Los Angeles
University of California, Berkeley alumni
University of California, Los Angeles faculty
California Republicans